Elmo Lieftink (born 22 February 1994) is a Dutch professional footballer who plays as a midfielder for Eerste Divisie club Helmond Sport.

Club career
Lieftink joined Willem II in summer 2016, after failing to break through into the Vitesse first team, although appearing several times on the bench. On 16 December 2016, Lieftink made his Willem II debut in a 2–1 home victory over Heerenveen, replacing Erik Falkenburg with two minutes remaining.

Lieftink joined Helmond Sport on 30 May 2022, signing a three-year contract. He made his competitive debut for the club on the first matchday of the season, playing the full game against NAC Breda which was lost 1–0.

Career statistics

References

External links
 

1994 births
Living people
Footballers from Deventer
Dutch footballers
Association football midfielders
Eredivisie players
Eerste Divisie players
SBV Vitesse players
Willem II (football club) players
Go Ahead Eagles players
De Graafschap players
Helmond Sport players